The North Metropolitan Region (also called North Zone) (Región Metropolitana Norte in Spanish) is an intermunicipality zone in Buenos Aires Province, Argentina, created on 10 April 2000. The partidos that comprise this region are San Fernando, San Isidro, Vicente López and Tigre.

It has a continental surface of about 257 km2 and an insular surface of 1,140 km2. It has a population of about 1,118,000 people.

External links
 North zone on-line news (in spanish)

 
Geography of Buenos Aires Province
Buenos Aires